Stefanos Manikas (14 April 1952 – 26 August 2015) was a Greek politician of the Panhellenic Socialist Movement (PASOK) who was Minister of State. He died on 26 August 2015, at the age of 63, from cancer.

References

1952 births
2015 deaths
Ministers of State (Greece)
Deaths from cancer in Greece
Politicians from Athens